Thomas Ho (born June 17, 1973 in Winter Haven, Florida) is a former professional tennis player from the United States. His parents are immigrants from Taiwan.

Tennis career

Juniors
Ho first came to the tennis world's attention as an exceptionally successful junior player. He won several junior tennis events in the 1980s, and set a number of 'youngest-ever' records.

Pro tour
In August 1988, Ho became the youngest male player in the open era to play in the main draw of the US Open singles at the age of 15 years and 2 months. He lost the first round match to Johan Kriek 6–4, 7–6, 7–6. That same month, Ho became the second youngest male player to win a main draw match at a top-level tour event when he beat Matt Anger in the first round at Rye Brook 6–4, 3–6, 6–4, just after Argentina's Franco Davín.

Ho's early successes drew many comparisons with Michael Chang, another Asian American tennis player who achieved great success as a junior. However Ho did not manage to make the same kind of impact on the professional circuit as Chang (who went on to win the French Open and reach the World No. 2 singles ranking). Ho enjoyed some success in satellite tournaments, but did not win any top-level singles events on the tour. He did, however, win four tour doubles titles (Beijing in 1994, and Beijing, Hong Kong and Indian Wells in 1995).

Ho's professional career was hampered by injuries. In 1995, Ho and Brett Steven became the fastest-ever losers of a match at Wimbledon. In the very first point of their Men's Doubles match, Steven served and Ho tried to intercept the return at the net, only to injure his back. The pair thus had had to forfeit the match after just one rally, which had lasted all of five seconds. The back injury was to recur again in future years, and eventually led to Ho's retirement from the tour in 1997.

During his professional career, Ho reached career-high rankings of World No. 85 in singles and World No. 13 in doubles. His career prize-money totalled $793,819.

Post-retirement

Since retiring from the tour, Ho has completed a degree at Rice University in Houston and worked as a tennis journalist.

In 2011, Ho was inducted into the USTA Florida Hall of Fame.

After working as a partner at global recruiting firm Heidrick & Struggles, he is currently the Chief Talent Officer at Quantum Energy Partners.

ATP career finals

Doubles: 7 (4 titles, 3 runner-ups)

ATP Challenger and ITF Futures Finals

Singles: 8 (4–4)

Doubles: 6 (4–2)

Performance timelines

Singles

Doubles

References

External links
 
 

1973 births
Living people
American male tennis players
American sportspeople of Chinese descent
American people of Taiwanese descent
People from Winter Haven, Florida
Rice University alumni
Tennis people from Florida
Taiwanese-American tennis players